Shlomo Gur (Gerzovsky) (1913-2000), founder member of Kibbutz Tel Amal, is credited with creating and then managing the construction of 57 homa u'migal (tower and stockade settlements) during the 1936–39 Arab revolt in Palestine. Following the establishment of the state of Israel, he was project manager of the Hebrew University, the National Library and the Knesset.

In summer 1936, the expanding Arab revolt endangered the Jewish population of Beit She'an Valley. Concerned with safety and security, Shlomo Gur and other members of Kibbutz Tel Amal built the first homa u'migal settlement. Subsequently, Shlomo Gur consulted Jerusalem architect Yohanan Ratner and was provided with blueprints for the other settlements.

Shlomo Gur was the first director of Israel's Military research department.

Gallery

See also
 Tegart fort

References

1913 births
2000 deaths
Israeli architects
Jews in Mandatory Palestine
Kibbutzniks
Hebrew University of Jerusalem
National Library of Israel